Koprivë (in Albanian) or Kopriva (in Serbian: Коприва) is a village in the municipality of Mitrovica in the District of Mitrovica, Kosovo. According to the 2011 census, it has 55 inhabitants, all Albanians.

Notes

References 

Villages in Mitrovica, Kosovo